Men Suddenly in Black is a 2003 Hong Kong sex comedy parody of Hong Kong triad films directed by Pang Ho-Cheung. The sequel Men Suddenly in Black II was released in 2006.

Plot
As their wives and girlfriends embark on a trip to Thailand, four men spend the next 14 hours trying to engage in romantic affairs before their return.

Cast and roles

Cameos

Awards
23rd Annual Hong Kong Film Awards (2004):
 Winner – Best Supporting Actor (Tony Leung Ka-Fai)
 Winner – Best New Director (Pang Ho-Cheung)
40th Annual Golden Horse Awards
 Nomination – Best Director (Pang Ho-Cheung)
 Nomination – Best Supporting Actor (Chapman To Man-Chat)
 Nomination – Best Original Screenplay (Pang Ho-Cheung, Erica Lee Man, Patrick Kong)
10th Annual Hong Kong Film Critics Society Awards
 Recommended Film

References

External links
 

Hong Kong sex comedy films
2003 films
2000s Cantonese-language films
Films directed by Pang Ho-cheung
2000s Hong Kong films